Helianthella durangensis is a rare Mexican plant in the family Asteraceae, found only in the State of Durango in northern Mexico.

Each head contains both ray flowers and disc flowers.

References

External links

durangensis
Flora of Durango
Plants described in 1893